Country Mile is the fourth full-length album by Johnny Flynn, released in 2013. The album was recorded with members of his backing band The Sussex Wit and was announced in conjunction with a tour, as well as the release of a single "The Lady is Risen". Country Mile was issued by Transgressive Records and became Flynn's first UK Top 75 hit, peaking at number 58 on the chart dated 12 October 2013.

Reception

In his review for Allmusic, critic Timothy Monger wrote "What sets Johnny Flynn apart from many of Britain's better-known new folk-revivalists is his knack for timeless, literate songwriting. Delivered with the confidence of a seasoned Shakespearian actor and the severity and humor of a young Richard Thompson, Flynn's songs come from a more arcane place in the English idiom, managing to seem both profound and conversational at once."

Holly Williams of The Independent wrote "Flynn’s language and cadence can be quaintly archaic; his wandering-minstrel lyrics poetic, and apple-sweet." John Murphy of musicOMH wrote "Flynn remains one of the country’s most overlooked songwriters and Country Mile is a good reminder of his skill with a well-crafted song."

Matthew Horton of NME was less enthusiastic about the release, writing "Johnny Flynn moonlights as an actor, and it shows. His folk-rock has always felt a bit forced, and album number three is rootsy like the Chelsea Flower Show, blooming with mega-twee lyrics... There’s even a song called ‘Tinker’s Trail’, for Christ’s sake. If things get any more contrived his next album will feature a duet with a cow."

Track listing
All songs composed by Johnny Flynn

Personnel
 Johnny Flynn – vocals, guitar, bass, harmonium, mandolin, piano, organ, violin, trumpet, Wurlitzer, flugelhorn, percussion
 Spencer Cullum – pedal steel guitar
 Adam Beach – bass
 David Beauchamp – drums
 Joe Zeitlin – cello
 James Mathé – backing vocals
 Lillie Flynn – backing vocals

Production
 Mark Ospovat – engineer
 Giles Barrett – engineer, mixing
 Simon Trought – engineer, mixing
 David Holmes – engineer, mixing
 Guy Davie – mastering
 Luke Montgomery – cover photo
 Lisa Piercy – art direction
 A.G. Brooks – design

References

Johnny Flynn (musician) albums
Transgressive Records albums
2013 albums